Lamont "MoMo" Jones (born June 26, 1990) is an American professional basketball player who last played for Semt77 Yalovaspor of the Turkish Basketball First League. He was a standout college player for Iona College and was an honorable mention All-American and conference player of the year as a senior. He also played at the University of Arizona.

Playing background
Jones, a 6'0 guard from Harlem, New York, led prep powerhouse Oak Hill Academy to a 41-1 record as a senior, averaging 21.3 points and 8 assists per game.  He signed originally with the University of Southern California, but was released from his commitment when head coach Tim Floyd resigned.  He landed at Arizona and played two seasons for the Wildcats.  The highlight of his time in Tucson was scoring 16 points as Arizona upset top seeded defending champion Duke in the Sweet Sixteen of the 2011 NCAA Tournament.

Following the 2010–11 season, Jones decided to transfer from Arizona to Iona, a school closer to his home in New York City where his grandmother was ill.  He was granted a waiver by the National Collegiate Athletic Association (NCAA) and allowed to play immediately.  As a junior in 2011–12, Jones teamed with senior Scott Machado in the backcourt to lead the Gaels to the NCAA Tournament.  Jones scored 15.7 points per game and was named second team All-Metro Atlantic Athletic Conference (MAAC).

As a senior, Jones was asked to take on more of the scoring load for the Gaels and responded by averaging 22.6 points per game, finishing third in scoring nationally.  He led the Gaels back to the NCAA Tournament and at the end of the season was named the MAAC Player of the Year and an honorable mention All-American by the Associated Press.

Professional career
Jones declared for the 2013 NBA Draft, but he went undrafted. Jones then signed with the Kumamoto Volters in the Japanese National Basketball League.

On July 28, 2017, he signed for Mitteldeutscher BC. Jones inked with another Basketball Bundesliga team, MHP Riesen Ludwigsburg, on July 12, 2018.

On August 19, 2019, Jones signed with Skyliners Frankfurt of the Basketball Bundesliga.

On November 5, 2020, Jones signed with Semt77 Yalovaspor of Turkish Basketball League.

On July 22, 2022, he has signed with Mitteldeutscher BC of the German Basketball Bundesliga for a second stint.

On November 9, 2022, he signed with and returned to Semt77 Yalovaspor of the Turkish Basketball First League.

References

External links
 Asiabasket profile
 Iona Gaels bio

1990 births
Living people
American expatriate basketball people in Finland
American expatriate basketball people in Germany
American expatriate basketball people in Japan
American expatriate basketball people in Montenegro
American expatriate basketball people in Qatar
American expatriate basketball people in Saudi Arabia
American men's basketball players
Arizona Wildcats men's basketball players
Basketball players from New York City
Iona Gaels men's basketball players
KK Mornar Bar players
Kobrat players
Kumamoto Volters players
Oak Hill Academy (Mouth of Wilson, Virginia) alumni
Riesen Ludwigsburg players
Mitteldeutscher BC players
People from Harlem
Point guards
Shooting guards
Skyliners Frankfurt players
Sportspeople from Manhattan
Yalovaspor BK players